Víctor Víctor (1948–2020) was a Dominican guitarist, singer and composer.

Víctor Víctor may also refer to:

 Víctor Víctor Mesa (born 1996), Cuban professional baseball player
 Victor Victor Worldwide, an American record label, formerly known as Victor Victor Records

See also
 Victor Victori (born 1943), South Korean portraitist, painter, sculptor, author and ordained minister
 Victor and Victoria, a 1933 German musical comedy film
 Victor and Victoria (1957 film), a 1957 remake of the 1933 film
 Victor/Victoria, a 1982 British-American musical comedy film
 Victor/Victoria (musical), a Broadway musical based on the 1982 film
 Victor/Victoria (1995 film), a television production of the Broadway musical
 "Victor, Victrola", an episode of the television series Gossip Girl